Ivan Elez (born 9 September 1981) is a Croatian retired football player.

Club career
Elez was born in Split and started to play football in the mid-1990s at local club NK Omladinac Vranjic. In 1994, he was spotted by Hajduk Split, and started his professional career by joining the club in March of that year. He played for Hajduk until 1999, before moving to then second-division club NK Mosor, originally starting in the reserve team. After two seasons, he was promoted to the first team.

After two seasons with Mosor, he left and signed with NK Uskok, where he played for two seasons with some success. In the summer of 2005, Elez left Uskok and started to play for NK Slaven Belupo in the Croatian First Division, where he remained for two seasons, before joining NK Zadar. Elez remained at Zadar for one season, before leaving to play with Second Division side NK Solin.

After just half a season with Solin, Ivan returned to the first division, signing a contract with HNK Šibenik.

External links
 

1981 births
Living people
Footballers from Split, Croatia
Association football midfielders
Croatian footballers
NK Mosor players
NK Uskok players
NK Slaven Belupo players
NK Zadar players
NK Solin players
HNK Šibenik players
NK Dugopolje players
NK Šmartno 1928 players
First Football League (Croatia) players
Croatian Football League players
Slovenian Second League players
Croatian expatriate footballers
Expatriate footballers in Slovenia
Croatian expatriate sportspeople in Slovenia
Expatriate footballers in Hungary
Croatian expatriate sportspeople in Hungary